Local elections were held at Antipolo on May 9, 2022, as part of the Philippine general election. Held concurrently with the national elections, the electorate voted to elect a mayor, a vice mayor, sixteen councilors members, two members to the Rizal Provincial Board and two district representatives to congress. Those elected took their respective offices on June 30, 2022, for a three-year-long term.

Background 
Former Mayor Andrea "Andeng" Bautista-Ynares initially declared her intention to run for a second term. Later, she dropped her re-election bid, and she was replaced by her husband, former Rizal Governor and former Mayor Casimiro "Jun" Ynares III. He faced Wilfredo "Willie" Gelacio Sr., Pedro Leyble, Teddy Leyble, and Herminio Sanchez.

Vice Mayor Josefina "Pining" Gatlabayan ran for her third and final term. She faced new candidates, including Atty. Manuel Relorcasa, Edwin Reyes, and Joel Ronquillo.

First District Board Member Alexander "Bobot" Marquez sought a comeback in the city council. Former Mayor Danilo "Nilo" Leyble, who previously ran during 2016 as Vice Mayor, ran in his place unopposed.

Second District Board Member Roberto Andres "Randy" Puno Jr. ran for second term unopposed.

First District Representative Roberto "Robbie" Puno sought for second term. He was challenged by Salvador "Raldy" Abaño and Javez "Jebs" Tibio, ran independently.

Former Second District Representative Resurreccion Acop died in 2021 due to COVID-19, that made her place vacant. Her husband, former Representative Romeo Acop ran for her instead, unopposed.

Mayoral election 
Mayor Andrea "Andeng" Bautista-Ynares initially declared her intention to run for a second term. Later, she dropped her re-election bid, and she was replaced by her husband, former Rizal Governor and former Mayor Casimiro "Jun" Ynares III. Ynares won the elections with a huge margin against his closest opponent, Teddy Leyble.

Vice mayoral election 
Incumbent Vice Mayor Josefina "Pining" Gatlabayan was re-elected.

Provincial board elections

First District 
First District Board Member Roberto Andres "Randy" Puno Jr. won the elections unopposed.

Second District 
Second District Board Member Alexander "Bobot" Marquez sought comeback in the city council unsuccessfully. Former Mayor Danilo "Nilo" Leyble successfully replaced Marquez unopposed.

Congressional elections

First District 
First District Representative Roberto "Robbie" Puno won the elections.

Second District 
Former Second District Representative Resurreccion Acop died in 2021 due to COVID-19, that made her place vacant. Her husband, former Representative Romeo Acop made a successful comeback in congressional seat unopposed.

City council elections

First District 

|-
|bgcolor=black colspan=5|

Second District 

|-
|bgcolor=black colspan=5|

References

2022 Philippine local elections
Politics of Antipolo
May 2022 events in the Philippines
Elections in Antipolo
2022 elections in Calabarzon